Gordon Clifford (1902–1968) was an American lyricist who wrote music for Hollywood films in the 1930s. His best-known songs include Nacio Herb Brown's "Paradise", Alfred Newman's "Who Am I?" and Harry Barris's "It Must Be True" and "I Surrender Dear".

Clifford was born in Rhode Island and started studying the violin as a child. His first success as a songwriter came in the early 1930s, when Bing Crosby recorded "It Must Be True" and "I Surrender Dear" with Gus Arnheim's orchestra. The latter song has been recorded by many artists and is considered a jazz standard. Pola Negri sang Clifford and Nacio Herb Brown's "Paradise" in the 1931 film A Woman Commands. Although the film was unsuccessful, Bing Crosby's cover version of "Paradise" became a hit.

Notes

External links 

1902 births
1968 deaths
American lyricists